The women's lightweight (60 kilograms) event at the 2014 Asian Games took place from 27 September to 1 October 2014 at Seonhak Gymnasium, Incheon, South Korea.

Indian boxer Laishram Sarita Devi lost a highly controversial semifinal bout against eventual silver medalist Park Jin-a of South Korea. Despite what many believed was a better performance by Sarita Devi, all three ringside judges ruled in favor of her opponent, leading to a 0–3 decision. The decision, which drew huge criticism, left Sarita Devi in a state of shock and she was seen weeping inconsolably. Sarita Devi stunned officials and spectators by refusing to accept the bronze medal during the medal ceremony. Devi initially took her bronze medal and placed it around Park Jin-a's neck. After reluctantly receiving her medal back from Park Jin-a, Devi left the medal on the podium after the conclusion of the ceremony.

Schedule
All times are Korea Standard Time (UTC+09:00)

Results 
Legend
TKO — Won by technical knockout

References

Results

External links
Official website

Boxing at the 2014 Asian Games